Banamalipur is a locality in Agartala, Tripura, India.

Politics
Banamalipur assembly constituency is part of Tripura West (Lok Sabha constituency), Tripura, India.

References

Neighbourhoods in Agartala